Adolphe Jean Menjou (February 18, 1890 – October 29, 1963) was an American actor. His career spanned both silent films and talkies. He appeared in such films as Charlie Chaplin's A Woman of Paris, where he played the lead role; Stanley Kubrick's Paths of Glory with Kirk Douglas; Ernst Lubitsch's The Marriage Circle;  The Sheik with Rudolph Valentino; Morocco with Marlene Dietrich and Gary Cooper; and A Star Is Born with Janet Gaynor and Fredric March, and was nominated for an Academy Award for The Front Page in 1931.

Early life
Adolphe Jean Menjou was born on February 18, 1890, in Pittsburgh, Pennsylvania, to a French father, Albert Menjou (1858–1917), and a mother from Ireland, Nora (née Joyce, 1869–1953). His brother, Henry Arthur Menjou (1891–1956), was a year younger. He was raised Catholic, attended the Culver Military Academy, and graduated from Cornell University with a degree in engineering. Attracted to the vaudeville stage, he made his movie debut in 1916 in The Blue Envelope Mystery. During World War I, he served as a captain in the United States Army Ambulance Service, for which he trained in Pennsylvania before going overseas.

Career and stardom

After returning from the war, Menjou gradually rose through the ranks with small but fruitful roles in films such as The Faith Healer (1921) alongside supporting roles in prominent films such as The Sheik (1921) and The Three Musketeers (1921). By 1922, he was receiving top or near-top billing, with a selection of those films being with Famous Players-Lasky and Paramount Pictures, starting with Pink Gods (1922), although he did films for various studios and directors. His supporting role in 1923's A Woman of Paris solidified the image of a well-dressed man-about-town, and he was voted Best Dressed Man in America nine times. He was noted as an example of a suave type of actor, one who could play lover or villain. In 1929, he attended the preview of Maurice Chevalier's first Hollywood film Innocents of Paris, and personally reassured Chevalier that he would enjoy a great future, despite the mediocre screenplay. He closed the end of the 1920s with star roles such as His Private Life (1928) and Fashions in Love (1929).

The crash of the stock market in 1929 meant that his contract with Paramount was cancelled, but he went on to Metro-Goldwyn-Mayer (MGM) and continued on with films (now talkies) in a variety of ways, with his knowledge of French and Spanish helping at key times, although his starring roles declined by this point. In 1930, he starred in Morocco, with Marlene Dietrich. He was nominated for an Academy Award for The Front Page (1931), after having received the role upon the death of Louis Wolheim during rehearsals. A variety of supporting roles in this decade were films such as A Farewell to Arms (1932), Morning Glory (1933), and A Star Is Born (1937).

His roles decreased slightly in the 1940s, but he did overseas work for World War II alongside supporting roles in films like Roxie Hart (1942) and State of the Union (1948). Over the course of his career, he bridged the gap of working with several noted directors that ranged from Frank Borzage to Frank Capra to Stanley Kubrick.

Later career
Menjou had just eleven roles in the 1950s, but he managed to snag one last leading role with the film noir The Sniper (1952). Incidentally, the director of that film was Edward Dmytryk, who had been a member of the Hollywood Ten, in which he was blacklisted from the film industry for not testifying to the House Un-American Activities Committee (HUAC) during the 'Red scare' before deciding to testify and name names as a brief member of the Communist Party.

In 1955, Menjou played Dr. Elliott Harcourt in "Barrier of Silence", episode 19 of the first season of the television series Science Fiction Theatre. He guest-starred as Fitch, with Orson Bean and Sue Randall as John and Ellen Monroe, in a 1961 episode, "The Secret Life of James Thurber", based on the works of American humorist James Thurber (especially "The Secret Life of Walter Mitty"), in the CBS anthology series The DuPont Show with June Allyson. He also appeared in the Thanksgiving episode of NBC's The Ford Show, Starring Tennessee Ernie Ford, which aired on November 22, 1956. Menjou ended his film career with such roles as French General George Broulard in Stanley Kubrick's film Paths of Glory (1957) and his final film role was that of the town curmudgeon in Disney's Pollyanna (1960).

Political beliefs
Menjou was a staunch Republican who equated the Democratic Party with socialism. He supported the Hoover administration's policies during the Great Depression. Menjou told a friend that he feared that if a Democrat won the White House, they "would raise taxes [and] destroy the value of the dollar," depriving Menjou of a good portion of his wealth. He took precautions against this threat: "I've got gold stashed in safety deposit boxes all over town... They'll never get an ounce from me." In the 1944 presidential election, he joined other celebrity Republicans at a rally in the Los Angeles Coliseum, organized by studio executive David O. Selznick, to support the Dewey–Bricker ticket and Governor Earl Warren of California, who would be Dewey's running mate in 1948. The gathering drew 93,000, with Cecil B. DeMille as the master of ceremonies and short speeches by Hedda Hopper and Walt Disney. Despite the rally's large turnout, most Hollywood celebrities who took public positions supported the Roosevelt–Truman ticket.

In 1947, Menjou cooperated with the House Committee on Un-American Activities saying that Hollywood "is one of the main centers of Communist activity in America". He added: "it is the desire and wish of the masters of Moscow to use this medium for their purposes" which is "the overthrow of the American government". Menjou was a leading member of the Motion Picture Alliance for the Preservation of American Ideals, a group formed to oppose communist influence in Hollywood, whose other members included John Wayne, Barbara Stanwyck (with whom Menjou costarred in Forbidden in 1932 and Golden Boy in 1939) and her husband, actor Robert Taylor.

Because of his political leanings, Menjou came into conflict with actress Katharine Hepburn, with whom he appeared in Morning Glory, Stage Door, and State of the Union (also starring Spencer Tracy). Hepburn was strongly opposed to the HUAC hearings, and their clashes were reportedly instant and mutually cutting. During a government deposition, Menjou said, "Scratch a do-gooder, like Hepburn, and they'll yell, 'Pravda'." To this, Hepburn called Menjou "wisecracking, witty—a flag-waving super-patriot who invested his American dollars in Canadian bonds and had a thing about Communists." In his book Kate, Hepburn biographer William Mann said that during the filming of State of the Union, she and Menjou spoke to each other only while acting.

Personal life 

Menjou was married three times. His first marriage, in 1920 to Kathryn Conn Tinsley, ended in divorce. He married Kathryn Carver in 1928; they divorced in 1934. His third and final marriage, to Verree Teasdale, lasted from 1934 until his death on October 29, 1963; they had one adopted son, Peter Menjou.

In 1948, Menjou published his autobiography, It Took Nine Tailors.

Menjou died on October 29, 1963, of hepatitis in Beverly Hills, California. He is interred beside Verree at Hollywood Forever Cemetery.

Legacy

For his contributions to the motion picture industry, Menjou has a star on the Hollywood Walk of Fame at 6826 Hollywood Boulevard.

Cultural references

Because of Menjou's public support of HUAC, the propaganda of the German Democratic Republic (GDR) often depicted their western opponents with Menjou-style moustaches, and it was considered a statement of political opposition to trim one's moustache that way. The style became a symbol for the resourceful criminal, and in Germany is still called Menjou-Bärtchen (Menjou beardlet). In German film and theatre, dubious men, opportunists, corrupt politicians, fraudulent persuaders, marriage impostors and other "slick" criminals often wear Menjou-Bärtchen. In real life, the style is often associated with opportunism.

Salvador Dalí admired Adolphe Menjou. 
He declared "la moustache d'Adolphe Menjou est surréaliste" and began offering fake mustaches from a silver cigarette case to other people with the words "Moustache? Moustache? Moustache?"

One of the most famous photographs by the avant-garde photographer Umbo is titled "Menjou En Gros" ca. 1928.

In the “Irresistible Andy” episode of The Andy Griffith Show, when Andy sees Barney dressed in fancy attire, Andy calls him “the Adolphe Menjou of Mayberry.”

Filmography

 The Acid Test (1914, Short) as Extra (uncredited)
 The Man Behind the Door (1914) as Ringmaster (uncredited)
 A Parisian Romance (1916) as Julianai
 Nearly a King (1916) as Baron
 The Price of Happiness (1916) as Howard Neal
 The Habit of Happiness (1916) as Society Man (uncredited)
 The Crucial Test (1916) as Count Nicolai
 The Devil at His Elbow (1916) as Wilfred Carleton
 The Reward of Patience (1916) as Paul Dunstan
 Manhattan Madness (1916) as Minor Role (uncredited)
 The Scarlet Runner (1916) as Bit Part
 The Kiss (1916) as Pennington
 The Blue Envelope Mystery (1916) as Bit Part (uncredited)
 The Valentine Girl (1917) as Joe Winder
 Wild and Woolly (1917) (uncredited)
 The Amazons (1917) (uncredited)
 An Even Break (1917) as Bit Part (uncredited)
 The Moth (1917) as Teddy Marbridge / The Husband
 What Happened to Rosa (1920) as Reporter Friend of Dr. Drew (uncredited)
 The Faith Healer (1921) as Dr. Littlefield
 Courage (1921) as Bruce Ferguson
 Through the Back Door (1921) as James Brewster
 The Three Musketeers (1921) as Louis XIII
 Queenie (1921) as Count Michael
 The Sheik (1921) as Dr. Raoul de St. Hubert
 Head Over Heels (1922) as Sterling
 Arabian Love (1922) as Captain Fortine (uncredited)
 Is Matrimony a Failure? (1922) as Dudley King
 The Fast Mail (1922) as Cal Baldwin
 The Eternal Flame (1922) as Duc de Langeais
 Pink Gods (1922) as Louis Barney
 Clarence (1922) as Hubert Stein
 Singed Wings (1922) as Bliss Gordon
 The World's Applause (1923) as Robert Townsend
 Bella Donna (1923) as Mr. Chepstow
 Rupert of Hentzau (1923) as Count Rischenheim
 A Woman of Paris (1923) as Pierre Revel
 The Spanish Dancer (1923) as Don Salluste
 The Marriage Circle (1924) as Prof. Josef Stock
 Shadows of Paris (1924) as Georges de Croy, His Secretary
 The Marriage Cheat (1924) as Bob Canfield
 Broadway After Dark (1924) as Ralph Norton
 For Sale (1924) as Joseph Hudley
 Broken Barriers (1924) as Tommy Kemp
 Sinners in Silk (1924) as Arthur Merrill
 Open All Night (1924) as Edmund Durverne
 The Fast Set (1924) as Ernest Steel
 Forbidden Paradise (1924) as Chancellor
 A Kiss in the Dark (1925) as Walter Grenham
 The Swan (1925) as Albert von Kersten-Rodenfels
 Are Parents People? (1925) as Mr. Hazlitt
 Lost: A Wife (1925) as Tony Hamilton
 The King on Main Street (1925) as King Serge IV of Molvania
 The Grand Duchess and the Waiter (1926) as Albert Durant
 Fascinating Youth (1926) as himself
 A Social Celebrity (1926) as Max Haber
 The Ace of Cads (1926) as Chappel Maturin
 The Sorrows of Satan (1926) as Prince Lucio de Rimanez
 Blonde or Brunette (1927) as Henri Martel
 Evening Clothes (1927) as Lucien d'Artois
 Service for Ladies (1927) as Albert Leroux
 A Gentleman of Paris (1927) as Marquis de Marignan
 Serenade (1927) as Franz Rossi
 A Night of Mystery (1928) as Captain Ferreol
 His Tiger Wife (1928) as Henri
 His Private Life (1928, with Kathryn Carver) as Georges St. Germain
 Marquis Preferred (1929) as Marquis d'Argenville
 Fashions in Love (1929) as Paul de Remy
 Soyons gais (1930) as Bob Brown
 My Childish Father (1930) as Jérome
 Amor audaz (1930) as Albert d'Arlons
 Mysterious Mr. Parkes (1930) as Courtenay Parkes
 Morocco (1930) as Monsieur La Bessiere
 New Moon (1930) as Governor Boris Brusiloff
 The Easiest Way (1931) as William Brockton
 Men Call It Love (1931) as Tony
 The Front Page (1931) as Walter Burns
 The Great Lover (1931) as Jean Paurel
 The Parisian (1931) as Jérome Rocheville
 Friends and Lovers (1931) as Captain Geoffrey Roberts
 Prestige (1931) as Capt. Remy Bandoin
 Wir schalten um auf Hollywood (1931) as himself
 Forbidden (1932) as Bob
 Wives Beware (1932, first film ever shown at a drive-in) as Maj. Carey Liston
 Bachelor's Affairs (1932) as Andrew Hoyt
 Diamond Cut Diamond (1932) as Dan McQueen
 The Night Club Lady (1932) as Police Commissioner Thatcher Colt
 A Farewell to Arms (1932) as Rinaldi
 The Circus Queen Murder (1933) as Thatcher Colt
 Morning Glory (1933) as Louis Easton
 The Worst Woman in Paris? (1933) as Adolphe Ballou
 Convention City (1933) as T.R. (Ted) Kent
 Easy to Love (1934) as John
 Journal of a Crime (1934) as Paul Moliet
 The Trumpet Blows (1934) as Pancho Montes / Pancho Gomez
 Little Miss Marker (1934) as Sorrowful Jones
 The Great Flirtation (1934) as Stephan Karpath
 The Human Side (1934) as Gregory Sheldon
 The Mighty Barnum (1934) as Bailey Walsh
 Gold Diggers of 1935 (1935) as Nicolai Nicoleff
 Broadway Gondolier (1935) as Professor Eduardo de Vinci
 The Milky Way (1936) as Gabby Sloan
 Sing, Baby, Sing (1936) as Bruce Farraday
 Wives Never Know (1936) as J. Hugh Ramsey
 One in a Million (1936) as Tad Spencer
 A Star Is Born (1937) as Oliver Niles
 Café Metropole (1937) as Monsieur Victor
 One Hundred Men and a Girl (1937) as John Cardwell
 Stage Door (1937) as Anthony Powell
 The Goldwyn Follies (1938) as Oliver Merlin
 Letter of Introduction (1938) as John Mannering
 Thanks for Everything (1938) as J. B. Harcourt
 King of the Turf (1939) as Jim Mason
 Golden Boy (1939) as Tom Moody
 The Housekeeper's Daughter (1939) as Deakon Maxwell
 That's Right—You're Wrong (1939) as Stacey Delmore
 Turnabout (1940) as Phil Manning
 A Bill of Divorcement (1940) as Hilary Fairfield
 Road Show (1941) as Colonel Carleton Carroway
 Father Takes a Wife (1941) as Senior
 Roxie Hart (1942) as Billy Flynn
 Syncopation (1942) as George Latimer
 You Were Never Lovelier (1942) as Eduardo Acuña
 Hi Diddle Diddle (1943) as Col. Hector Phyffe
 Sweet Rosie O'Grady (1943) as Tom Moran
 Step Lively (1944) as Wagner
 Man Alive (1945) as Kismet
 Heartbeat (1946) as Ambassador
 The Bachelor's Daughters (1946) as Alexander Moody
 I'll Be Yours (1947) as J. Conrad Nelson
 Mr. District Attorney (1947) as Craig Warren
 The Hucksters (1947) as Mr. Kimberly
 State of the Union (1948) as Jim Conover
 My Dream Is Yours (1949) as Thomas Hutchins
 Dancing in the Dark (1949) as Melville Crossman
 To Please a Lady (1950) as Gregg
 The Tall Target (1951) as Colonel Caleb Jeffers
 Across the Wide Missouri (1951) as Pierre
 The Sniper (1952) as Police Lt. Frank Kafka
 Man on a Tightrope (1953) as Fesker
 Timberjack (1955) as 'Sweetwater' Tilton
 The Ambassador's Daughter (1956) as Senator Jonathan Cartwright
 Bundle of Joy (1956) as J.B. Merlin
 The Fuzzy Pink Nightgown (1957) as Arthur Martin
 Paths of Glory (1957) as Major General Georges Broulard
 I Married a Woman (1958) as Frederick W. Sutton
 Pollyanna (1960) as Mr. Pendergast

Radio appearances

See also 
 List of actors with Academy Award nominations

References

External links

 
 
 
 
 Photographs of Adolphe Menjou

1890 births
1963 deaths
20th-century American male actors
American anti-communists
American male film actors
American male silent film actors
United States Army personnel of World War I
American people of French descent
American people of Irish descent
American Roman Catholics
Burials at Hollywood Forever Cemetery
California Republicans
Cornell University College of Engineering alumni
Deaths from hepatitis
Male actors from Pittsburgh
Pennsylvania Republicans
Vaudeville performers
John Birch Society members
Culver Academies alumni
Old Right (United States)
United States Army officers
Catholics from California
Catholics from Pennsylvania